Reflections in a Golden Eye is a 1967 American drama film directed by John Huston and based on the 1941 novel of the same name by Carson McCullers. It deals with elements of repressed sexuality, both homosexual and heterosexual, as well as voyeurism and murder. The film stars Elizabeth Taylor and Marlon Brando.

Plot
The film tells of six central characters, their failures, obsessions and darkest desires. Set at a U.S. Army post in the South in the late 1940s, it features Major Weldon Penderton and his wife Leonora. Other central characters are Lieutenant Colonel Morris Langdon and his depressed wife Alison, the Langdons' houseboy Anacleto, and Private Ellgee Williams.

Major Penderton assigns Private Williams to clear some foliage at his private officer's quarters instead of his usual duty of maintaining the horses and stables. Penderton's wife Leonora prepares to go horseback riding with Lt. Col. Langdon. Their affair is revealed, as well as Leonora's strong bond with her horse Firebird. Williams is shown to be sympathetic to all the horses in the stable. One day while riding, Langdon, Leonora and Penderton see Williams riding nude and bareback on one of the military horses. Penderton is critical of this to Leonora but his secret interest in the free-spirited Williams is clear.

Leonora and Penderton have an argument that same night, in which Leonora taunts Penderton and strips naked in front of him. Williams watches them from outside the house, and from then on spies on them. He eventually breaks into the house and watches Leonora sleep at night, unbeknownst to Penderton as they have separate bedrooms. As he continues this practice, Williams starts to go through Leonora's belongings, especially her lingerie and perfume.

Penderton takes Firebird and rides wildly into the woods, passing the naked Williams at high speed. Penderton falls off, catching his foot in the stirrup, and is dragged for a distance. In a fit of uncontrollable rage, he viciously beats the horse and begins to sob. Williams appears, still naked, and takes the horse. As Penderton stands mute in the woods, Williams brings the horse back to the stable to tend its wounds. Penderton returns to the house, locked in his room while Leonora hosts a party outside. Upon finding out about her horse's injuries, Leonora interrupts her party and in front of the guests repeatedly strikes her husband in the face with her riding crop. Penderton becomes infatuated with Williams and starts to follow him around the camp.

Alison Langdon mutilated herself while deeply depressed after the death of her newborn infant. Her only bonds now are with her effeminate Filipino houseboy Anacleto and with Capt. Murray Weincheck, a cultured and sensitive soldier who is being harassed out of the army by his superiors. Aware of her husband's adultery, Alison decides to divorce him. However, after witnessing Williams in Leonora's room, she becomes traumatized. When she tries to leave him, Langdon commits her to a sanatorium. Langdon tells Leonora and Penderton that Alison was going insane. Soon, Penderton is informed that Alison died of a heart attack. Anacleto disappears soon after her death.

One night, Penderton looks out his window and sees Williams outside the house. He thinks Williams is coming to see him, but watches the younger man enter his wife Leonora's room instead. Penderton turns on the light to find Williams fondling his wife's underwear and shoots him dead. The film ends with the camera wildly veering back and forth among the dead body, the screaming Leonora, and Penderton. The opening line of the novel and the film is restated: "There is a fort in the South where a few years ago a murder was committed."

Cast
 Marlon Brando – Major Weldon Penderton
 Elizabeth Taylor – Leonora Penderton
 Brian Keith – Lt Colonel Morris Langdon
 Julie Harris – Alison Langdon
 Zorro David – Anacleto
 Robert Forster – Private L. G. Williams

Production
Taylor accepted the part on the condition that Montgomery Clift would be cast as well. However, Clift died on July 23, 1966, of a heart attack before production began. The role subsequently went to Brando after both Richard Burton and Lee Marvin turned it down. Some of the film was shot in New York City and on Long Island, where Huston was permitted to use the former Mitchel Field, then in use by Nassau Community College. Many of the interiors and some of the exteriors were filmed in Italy.

The film was originally released with all scenes tinted with a gold filter, with only certain shades of reds (such as a rose) or greens not appearing in or approaching tints or shades of gold. This effect is a reference to the houseboy's drawing of a golden peacock in whose eye the world is a reflection. As this version puzzled audiences, it was withdrawn within one week of release and replaced with a version processed in normal Technicolor. Film critic Roger Ebert wrote: 
"Since the film was photographed in full color and the 'fading' was done in post-production, most of the video versions have simply restored the color. That's not what Huston intended, and the thing to do is to use your color adjustment to fade the color to almost but not quite b&w. Does it work? That's for you to decide."

A 2020 two-disc Blu-ray release of the film by Warner Bros. Home Entertainment features both Huston's intended version of the film and the re-color-timed reissued version.

Reception
The film received mixed reviews at the time of its release. Variety called it a "pretentious melodrama" but praised Keith's "superb" performance as the "rationalizing and insensitive middle-class hypocrite." Time described it as a "gallery of grotesques," with the poetry of the novel missing from the film. Its critic wrote: "All that remains praiseworthy is the film's extraordinary photographic technique."

Roger Ebert observed that the film was released without the usual publicity, despite its stellar cast and director: "Was the movie so wretchedly bad that Warner Bros. decided to keep it a secret? Or could it be, perhaps, that it was too good?" Ebert praised the production but noted that some audience members reacted to the film's emotional moments with guffaws and nervous laughter. John Simon wrote: "Yet for all its fidelity to the original, John Huston's film, with a script by Champman Mortimer and Gladys Hill, is a pedestrian, crass, and uninvolving to the point of repellance."

The film received a score of 55% on Rotten Tomatoes from 22 reviews.

The film opened at number one at the US box office. The author of the novel, Carson McCullers, died a fortnight before the premiere.

Legacy
Still photographs of Brando in character as Major Penderton were used later by the producers of Apocalypse Now. These photos of a younger Brando were displayed in the service record of the character Colonel Walter E. Kurtz.

See also
 List of American films of 1967

References

External links
 
 
 
 
 

1967 films
1967 drama films
1967 LGBT-related films
1960s American films
1960s English-language films
American drama films
American LGBT-related films
Films based on American novels
Films based on works by Carson McCullers
Films directed by John Huston
Gay-related films
Southern Gothic films
Warner Bros. films